"Just Hold On" is a song by American DJ Steve Aoki and English singer and songwriter Louis Tomlinson, released through Ultra Music as the latter's debut solo single on 10 December 2016. The song was written by Aoki and Tomlinson alongside Eric Rosse, Sasha Sloan and Sir Nolan, and was produced by Aoki, Sir Nolan and Jay Pryor. Aoki and Tomlinson performed the song for the first time on the 2016 series finale of The X Factor (UK).

"Just Hold On" debuted at number two on the UK Singles Chart, and number 52 on the US Billboard Hot 100, making it Aoki's highest-charting song in both countries. The song's music video was released on March 8, 2017. The song reached number one on the Billboard Dance/Electronic Digital Song Sales. The song is also included as a bonus track on the Japanese version of Tomlinson's debut album Walls.

Background and release
"Just Hold On" is the first solo music project by Tomlinson after One Direction began their first official break in December 2015. A preview of the song was released on December 9.

Tomlinson's debut performance of "Just Hold On" on The X Factor (UK) came just days after it was announced that his mother, Johannah Deakin, died at the age of 42 after a battle with leukemia. The song was made available on the iTunes Store and streaming services on December 10, 2016.

Composition
"Just Hold On" is written in the key of B major with a tempo of 115 beats per minute in common time.  The verses follow a chord progression of G–E–B–F, and Tomlinson's vocals span from F3 to B4.

Critical reception
In the website Idolator, Christina Lee wrote the song is an "uplifting EDM fare that comes standard with summer music festivals, though also a brand new direction for Louis after five One Direction albums." Time called it an "undeniably catchy track, a surprisingly gentle mix of Aoki’s EDM backing and Tomlinson’s melodic boy band vocals". Music website DirectLyrics stated: "Although Steve Aoki's electro-house beat flows well with the uplifting message of the song, I hope Louis releases an acoustic version of "Just Hold On" in the future". Express also called the track "fittingly uplifting". We Got This Covered described Aoki's production, stating: "Aoki layers in mid tempo four on the floor rhythms, injecting a tropical vibe moving into the chorus with exotic melodies and undeniable groove; it looks like Aoki is hoping to get in on the EDM-pop crossover trend...of 2016. Thankfully, he doesn’t go the future bass route, opting instead to craft a tropical pop production elevated by Louis Tomlinson’s smooth vocal approach. “Just Hold On” is definitely catchy enough to get some heavy radio play, and Tomlinson's presence on the song may just be enough to score Steve Aoki a full-fledged pop hit."

Charts

Weekly charts

Year-end charts

Certifications

Awards and nominations

References

External links

2016 debut singles
2016 songs
Louis Tomlinson songs
Number-one singles in Scotland
Steve Aoki songs
Songs written by Louis Tomlinson
Songs written by Steve Aoki
Songs written by Eric Rosse
Songs written by Sir Nolan
Ultra Music singles
Songs written by Sasha Alex Sloan